Hnin Pyauk Tae Nway is a 1967 Burmese black-and-white drama film, directed by Thet Lal starring Win Oo, Tin Tin Mu and Tin Tin Aye.

Cast
Win Oo
Tin Tin Mu
Tin Tin Aye

References

1967 films
1960s Burmese-language films
Burmese drama films
Films shot in Myanmar
1967 drama films